Richard Berney (1674-c.1738), of Langley, Norfolk, was an English politician.

He studied law at Gray's Inn and was Recorder of Norwich from 1727 to his death.

He was a Member (MP) of the Parliament of Great Britain for Norwich 1710–1715.

References

1674 births
1738 deaths
People from South Norfolk (district)
Members of Gray's Inn
Members of the Parliament of Great Britain for English constituencies
British MPs 1710–1713
British MPs 1713–1715